The possibility that Adolf Hitler had only one testicle has been a fringe subject among historians and academics researching the German leader. The rumor may be an urban myth, possibly originating from the contemporary British military song "Hitler Has Only Got One Ball".

Hitler's doctor  and his personal  physician Theodor Morell disregarded the idea of Hitler's monorchism and said there was nothing wrong with Hitler's testicles.  However, Hitler often refused to undress for medical exams.  In 1970, the Soviet Union claimed an autopsy showed Hitler was missing a testicle, but the historical accuracy of the report is disputed.  In December 2015, it was reported that doctor's notes from Landsberg Prison recorded that Hitler had "right-sided cryptorchidism", on evidence from an enforced medical examination Hitler underwent in 1923.

Evidence

World War I medical records
In November 2008, the discovery of an eye-witness account on how Hitler was treated after being shot on the Western Front during World War I was announced in the press. According to these reports, a former German Army Medic named Johan Jambor gave an account to a Polish priest and amateur historian, Franciszek Pawlar, in the 1960s, of how he saved Hitler's life in 1916 after a groin injury and saw that he had lost a testicle. Jambor said that as they were carrying Hitler away, they came under French fire and had to temporarily abandon him, upon which he began to scream very loudly, imploring them to come back and threatening them with court martial if they left him behind. Pawlar's record of the conversation was discovered by Pawlar's relatives and published by Polish author Grzegorz Wawoczny. The tabloid Bild says that, according to Jambor, "His abdomen and legs were covered in blood. Hitler was wounded in the abdomen and had lost a testicle. His first question to the doctor was: 'Can I still father children?

Military records show that Hitler was wounded in 1916 during the Battle of the Somme, which has been described as a wound to the groin or in the left thigh when a shell exploded in the dispatch runners' dugout. Other more recent historians, such as Ian Kershaw, conclude the wound was to Hitler's left thigh.

Prison records

In December 2015, it was reported that documents from Landsberg prison were to be released and compiled for a book. Amongst them is a note in prison doctor Josef Brinsteiner's "Aufnahmebuch" (book of arrivals at prison), who reportedly examined Hitler in 1923, saying that he had "right-sided cryptorchidism".

Soviet autopsy
In 1968, Soviet journalist Lev Bezymenski published his book, The Death of Adolf Hitler. He describes a purported Soviet forensic examination and published the alleged autopsy led by Faust Shkaravsky. The document was stated to have been compiled shortly after the conclusion of World War II on the basis of the examination of the remains claimed to be those of Hitler, stated he was monorchid. It stated:

Robert G. L. Waite, in his book The Psychopathic God: Adolf Hitler (1978), accepted the accuracy of this evidence:

Mainline historians have concluded that since 1945, the Soviet Union presented various versions of Hitler's fate. This led to the autopsy conclusions being questioned in terms of propaganda. Journalist Ron Rosenbaum argues in his book Explaining Hitler that the Soviet autopsy of Hitler cannot be accepted as authoritative because the Führer's body was said to have been almost completely immolated after his suicide inside the Führerbunker. There were insufficient remains for any proper analysis to be conducted. Rosenbaum suggests that based on information from Hitler's own doctor and recantations by the compilers of the published form of the report, the Soviet autopsy report was a fabrication.

Historian Anton Joachimsthaler, in his extensive investigation of the circumstances surrounding Hitler's death, quotes a German pathologist as saying about the autopsy described in Bezymenski's book: "Bezemensky's report is ridiculous. ... Any one of my assistants would have done better ... the whole thing is a farce ... it is intolerably bad work ... the transcript of the post-mortem section of 8 [May] 1945 describes anything but Hitler." Noted historian Ian Kershaw describes the corpses of Eva Braun and Hitler as being fully burned when the Red Army found them, with only a lower jaw-bone and a dental bridge identifiable as Hitler's remains. Historian Luke Daly-Groves states that "the Soviet soldiers picked up whatever mush they could find in front of Hitler's bunker exit, put it in a box and claimed it was the corpses of Adolf and Eva Hitler. The unprofessional behavior of the Soviet intelligence officers and the resulting poor quality of their investigations, the dubious autopsy report riddled with scientific inconsistencies and tainted by ideological motivations... lead me to agree with historians, such as Joachimsthaler, Fest and Kershaw", reaching the conclusion the Soviets did not find Hitler's corpse.

An interview with the Soviet doctor, Lt. Col. Favst Shkaravsky, who led Hitler's autopsy is in the extras section on the DVD of the 1970s documentary series The World At War. Shkaravsky claims that those performing the alleged autopsy unexpectedly found one testicle missing. Shkaravsky states categorically that Hitler was not shot in the head. This is in clear contrast to the evidence that has established that Hitler shot himself in the right temple, and that different versions of Hitler's fate were presented by the Soviet Union according to its political desires.

Song
During World War II, the song "Hitler Has Only Got One Ball" was popular among British citizens. British author Donough O'Brien says his father, Toby O'Brien, wrote an original set of lyrics in August 1939 as part of the country's official program of propaganda. This has led to the suspicion that the source of this myth stems from the British song, usually put to the tune of the "Colonel Bogey March".

Modern allusions
Before finding success with Violent Femmes in the 1980s, band members Brian Ritchie and Victor DeLorenzo were members of a group called "Hitler's Missing Testis".

Hitler's monorchism was used as an easter egg in Sniper Elite video games, under the Kill Hitler DLC.

The subject of Hitler's monorchism is used as a joke in the 2019 film Jojo Rabbit, wherein Captain Deertz of the Gestapo states to titular main character: "you and your friends may have heard a rumor that Hitler has only one ball. This is nonsense. He has four."

References

Citations

Bibliography

External links 
 Graphic showing the prison doctor's note from 1923

Monorchism
Hitler, Adolf
Hitler, Adolf, possible monorchism